Gonnetot is a commune in the Seine-Maritime department in the Normandy region in northern France. Residents are referred to as 'Gonnetotais'.

Geography

Population

Places of interest
 The fourteenth century church of Saint-Firmin, rebuilt in 1861.

See also
Communes of the Seine-Maritime department

References

Communes of Seine-Maritime